AfterImage is a Filipino rock band formed in 1986, best known for their songs "Habang May Buhay", "Next in Line", and "Mangarap Ka". They disbanded in 1997 and became active again in 2008 after they reunited and released their fourth studio album. After disbanding in 1997, Wency Cornejo, the band's vocalist, pursued a solo career.

In January 1992, the band signed with Dyna Records, The band's first album, entitled Touch the Sun, was released in July 1992. Among the eight songs that the album contained, four were released as singles: "Next in Line", "Bai (Sa Langit ang Ating Tagpuan)", "Only You", and "Pagtawid". The title of the album, which was the concluding part of the lyric to "Next in Line", was said to have just been a spontaneous utter of phrase which Cornejo made during the recording session for the said song.

History
The band was composed of five members: Bobit Uson on bass guitar, Chuck Isidro on lead guitar, Rogie Callejo on drums, Arnold Cabalza on keyboards and Wency Cornejo on vocals. Francis Reyes was the former guitarist of the band before Chuck Isidro took his role.

In 1994 at the height of the first band craze in the Philippine music scene, AfterImage released their second album titled Tag-Ulan, Tag-Araw. The album's name was taken from two singles from the album. "Tag-ulan", the album's carrier single, topped various charts in the Philippines and was awarded a Gold Record Award, and later the follow-up single "Mangarap Ka" also became a huge hit for the band. They also won the first NU Rock Award for Artist of the Year in the same year.
At the 1995 Awit Awards the album Tag-Ulan, Tag-Araw was named Album of the Year. A few months after winning the awards, Niño Mesina became the band's newest bassist leading Bobit Uson to play guitar alongside Chuck Isidro.

In 1996, the band released their 3rd album "Bagong Araw".

In 1997, AfterImage disbanded due to management conflicts. After 11 years of disbandment, the band reunited in 2008 for their new album, Our Place Under the Sun. from Viva Records, 12 years since their last album in 1996 from Dyna Records.

Members

Current members
Wency Cornejo – lead vocals 
Chuck Isidro – lead and rhythm guitar
Bobit Uson – bass guitar
Rogie Callejo – drums
Arnold Cabalza – keyboards, backing vocals

Former members
Francis Reyes – lead guitar

Discography

Studio albums
Touch the Sun (1992)
Tag-Ulan, Tag-Araw (1994)
Bagong Araw (1996)
Our Place Under the Sun (2008)

Compilation albums
Lites (1995)
Greatest Hits (1996)

Singles
"Next in Line" (1992)
"Bai" (1992)
"Believe"
"Brightest Day"
"Castaway"
"Defenseless"
"Extro"
"Finding it Hard to Breathe"
"Forevermore" (1994)
"Habang Ako Ay Narito" (While I am Here)
"Habang May Buhay" (While There's Life)
"Lakas" (Strength)
"Mangarap Ka" (Dream)
"More Than Life"
"Musikero" (Musician)
"Only You"
"Our Place Under the Sun"
"Pagkat Ika'y Narito" (Because You're Here)
"Pagtawid" (Crossing)
"Panahon" (Time)
"Patalim" (Blade)
"Standing By Your Side"
"Tag-Araw" (Summer Season)
"Tag-Ulan" (Rainy Season)
"Without You"
"You Made Me Believe"

Post-AfterImage
Former AfterImage lead singer Wency Cornejo went a solo career after the disbandment of the pop rock band in 1997.  Aside from being a singer, he was also a former TV host for the youth-oriented lifestyle documentary magazine program "Tipong Pinoy" starring with his co-host, the late Susan Calo-Medina.  Cornejo still performing mostly in music bars & restaurants. Chuck Isidro went on to join the music group 6cyclemind.

Awards

References

Filipino rock music groups
1984 establishments in the Philippines
Viva Records (Philippines) artists